German Romanticism was the dominant intellectual movement of German-speaking countries in the late 18th and early 19th centuries, influencing philosophy, aesthetics, literature, and criticism. Compared to English Romanticism, the German variety developed relatively early, and, in the opening years, coincided with Weimar Classicism (1772–1805). In contrast to the seriousness of English Romanticism, the German variety of Romanticism notably valued wit, humour, and beauty.

The early period, roughly 1797 to 1802, is referred to as Frühromantik or Jena Romanticism. The philosophers and writers central to the movement were Wilhelm Heinrich Wackenroder (1773–1798), Friedrich Wilhelm Joseph Schelling (1775–1854), Friedrich Schleiermacher (1768–1834), Karl Wilhelm Friedrich Schlegel (1772–1829), August Wilhelm Schlegel (1767–1845), Ludwig Tieck (1773–1853), and Friedrich von Hardenberg (Novalis) (1772–1801). 

The early German Romantics strove to create a new synthesis of art, philosophy, and science, by viewing the Middle Ages as a simpler period of integrated culture; however, the German Romantics became aware of the tenuousness of the cultural unity they sought. Late-stage German Romanticism emphasized the tension between the daily world and the irrational and supernatural projections of creative genius. In particular, the critic Heinrich Heine criticized the tendency of the early German Romantics to look to the medieval past for a model of unity in art and society.

A major product of the French occupation under Napoleon was a strong development in German nationalism which eventually turned the German Confederation into the German Empire after a series of conflicts and other political developments. German Romanticism was nationalistic and therefore became hostile to the ideals of the French Revolution. Major Romantic thinkers, especially Ernst Moritz Arndt, Johann Gottlieb Fichte, Heinrich von Kleist, and Friedrich Schleiermacher, embraced reactionary politics and were hostile to political liberalism, rationalism, neoclassicism, and cosmopolitanism.

Literary figures

 Ernst Moritz Arndt
 Achim von Arnim
 Bettina von Arnim
 Clemens Brentano
 Adelbert von Chamisso
 Joseph von Eichendorff
 Friedrich de la Motte Fouqué
 Johann Wolfgang von Goethe
 Heinrich Heine
 E. T. A. Hoffmann
 Friedrich Hölderlin
 Jean Paul
 Heinrich von Kleist
 Sophie Mereau
 Eduard Mörike
 Novalis (Friedrich von Hardenberg)
 Dorothea Schlegel
 Friedrich Schlegel
 August Wilhelm Schlegel
 Ernst Schulze
 Gustav Schwab
 Ludwig Tieck
 Ludwig Uhland
 Wilhelm Heinrich Wackenroder

Philosophical figures

 Joseph von Eichendorff
 Johann Gottlieb Fichte
 Johann Wolfgang von Goethe
 Johann Gottfried Herder
 Georg Wilhelm Friedrich Hegel
 August Ludwig Hülsen
 Friedrich Ludwig Jahn
 Adam Müller
 Novalis (Friedrich von Hardenberg)
 Friedrich Wilhelm Joseph Schelling
 Karoline Schelling
 Friedrich Schlegel
 Friedrich Schleiermacher
 Karl Wilhelm Ferdinand Solger
 Ludwig Uhland

Composers

 Ludwig van Beethoven. In his earlier works, Beethoven was a Classicist in the traditions of Mozart and Haydn (his tutor), but his Middle Period, beginning with his third symphony (the 'Eroica'), bridges the worlds of Classical and Romantic music. Because Beethoven wrote some of his greatest music after he became totally deaf, he embodies the Romantic ideal of the tragic artist who defies all odds to conquer his own fate. His later works portray the triumph of the human spirit, most notably his 'Choral' Symphony No. 9; the stirring 'Ode to Joy' from this symphony has been adopted as the anthem of the European Union.
 Johannes Brahms. His works are cast in the formal moulds of Classicism; he had a profound reverence for Beethoven. Brahms was also attracted to the exoticism of Hungarian folk music, and used it in such pieces as his famous Hungarian Dances, the final movement of his Violin Concerto, and the 'Rondo alla zingarese' from his Piano Quartet No. 1, op. 25, in G minor.
 Franz Liszt. Liszt was by nationality a Hungarian, but nevertheless he spent many years in Germany, and his first language was German. Credited as the inventor of the tone poem. In his old age, Liszt adopted a more dissonant, ominous flavour, characteristic works being 'la Lugubre Gondola' and 'Die Zelle in Nonnenwerth'—predating Impressionism and 20th-century atonality.
 Felix Mendelssohn Bartholdy. A composer of the Early Romantic period, together with such figures as Schumann, Chopin and Liszt. One of the persons responsible for reviving interest in the almost-forgotten music of Johann Sebastian Bach.
 Franz Schubert. His body of work consists mainly of song cycles and German Lieder set to poems by his contemporaries, many of which are among the most common repertoire in those categories performed today.
 Robert Schumann. His works recall the nostalgia of lost childhood innocence, first love, and the magnificence of the German countryside. As an influential critic, he played a major role in discovering new talents, among them Chopin and Brahms.
 Richard Wagner. The most famous composer of German opera; was an exponent of Leitmotif. One of the main figures in the so-called War of the Romantics.
 Carl Maria von Weber. Perhaps the very first of Romantic musicians, if we exclude Beethoven, in the sense that Weber was the first major composer to emerge wholly as a product of the Romantic school, as contrasted with Beethoven, who had started off as a Classicist. The emotional intensity and supernatural, folklore-based themes in his operas presented a radical break from the Neoclassical traditions of that time.

Visual artists

 Carl Blechen
 Carl Gustav Carus
 Johan Christian Dahl
 Christian Ezdorf
 Caspar David Friedrich
 Jacob Philipp Hackert
 Julius Hubner
 Otto Reinhold Jacobi
 Joseph Anton Koch
 Gerhard von Kügelgen
 Adrian Ludwig Richter
 Carl Rottmann
 Philipp Otto Runge
 Friedrich Wilhelm Schadow
 Carl Spitzweg
 Eberhard Wächter
 Anton Georg Zwengauer

Architecture

 Karl Friedrich Schinkel

See also

 Athenaeum
 Berlin Romanticism
 Culture of Germany
 Germanophile
 Heidelberg Romanticism
 Jena Romanticism
 List of Austrian intellectual traditions
 List of German-language philosophers
 Philosophy of culture
 Prussian virtues
 Sturm und Drang

References

Further reading

 Beiser, Frederick C. The Romantic Imperative: the Concept of Early German Romanticism. (Harvard University Press, 2003). 
 Benz, Ernst. The Mystical Sources of German Romantic Philosophy, translated by Blair R. Reynolds and Eunice M. Paul. London: Pickwick Publications, 2009. . (Original French edition: Les Sources mystiques de la philosophie romantique allemande. Paris : Vrin, 1968.)
 Bowie, Andrew. From romanticism to critical theory: The philosophy of German literary theory (Psychology Press, 1997).
 Breckman, Warren. "Introduction: A Revolution in Culture," in European Romanticism: A Brief History with Documents.  Ed. W. Breckman. New York: Bedford/St Martin's, 2007.

 Gossman, Lionel. "Making of a Romantic Icon: The Religious Context of Friedrich Overbeck's 'Italia und Germania.'" American Philosophical Society, 2007. .
 Gossman, Lionel. "Orpheus Philologus: Bachofen versus Mommsen on the Study of Antiquity." American Philosophical Society Transactions, 1983. .
 Grewe, Cordula. Painting the Sacred in the Age of German Romanticism. Aldershot: Ashgate Books, 2009.
 Johnston, Catherine, et al. Baltic Light: Early Open-Air Painting in Denmark and North Germany. New Haven and London: Yale University Press, 1999. .
 Lacoue-Labarthe, Philippe, and Jean-Luc Nancy. The literary absolute: the theory of literature in German romanticism (SUNY Press, 1988).
 Nassar, Dalia. The Romantic Absolute: Being and Knowing in Early German Romantic Philosophy, 1795–1804 (U of Chicago Press, 2013).

 Pfau, Thomas. "Conjuring history: Lyric cliche, conservative fantasy, and traumatic awakening in German Romanticism." South Atlantic Quarterly 102.1 (2003): 53–92. online

 Safrankski, Rüdiger. Romantik. Eine deutsche Affäre. Munich: Carl Hanser Verlag, 2007. .
 Seyhan, Azade. Representation and its discontents: The critical legacy of German romanticism (Univ of California Press, 1992).
 Siegel, Linda. Caspar David Friedrich and the Age of German Romanticism. Branden Publishing Co, 1978. .
 Steigerwald, Joan, and J. Fairbairn. "The cultural enframing of nature: environmental histories during the early German romantic period." Environment and History 6.4 (2000): 451–496. online
 Stone, Alison. "Alienation from nature and early German romanticism." Ethical Theory and Moral Practice 17.1 (2014): 41–54. online
 Stone, Alison. Nature, Ethics and Gender in German Romanticism and Idealism (Rowman & Littlefield, 2018).
 Vaughan, William. German Romantic Painting. New Haven and London: Yale University Press, 1980. .

Romanticism
Romanticism

Romantic